Aubange is a municipality and city of Wallonia located in the province of Luxembourg, Belgium.

On 1 January 2012 the municipality, which covers 45.6 km2, had 16,042 inhabitants, giving a population density of 330.9 inhabitants per km2. It is the third municipality of the Province of Luxembourg regarding the number of inhabitants but it is also among the smallest ones in terms of area.

The municipality is French-speaking but most of which falls within the Luxembourgish-speaking Arelerland, adjoins the tripoint where the borders of Belgium, the Grand Duchy of Luxembourg, and France meet.

The municipality consists of the following districts: Athus, Aubange, Halanzy, and Rachecourt.

History 

The district of Aubange was a municipality itself before the reorganization of the Belgian municipalities in 1977. Even though the new municipality took the name Aubange, the biggest place is Athus and it is where most of the services and official buildings are, like the townhall, the police station, the fire station, the post office, etc.

Geography 
Aubange is located in the Lorraine region in the south of Belgium just next to France and the Grand Duchy of Luxembourg.

Subdivisions 

The municipality consists of the following sub-municipalities: Aubange proper, Athus, Halanzy, and Rachecourt.

Other population centers include: Aix-sur-Cloie, Battincourt, and Guerlange.

Population 
The following graph represents the growing of the population in the municipality since 1990. The village of Aubange itself contains about 4,000 inhabitants.

Economy 

For a long time, Aubange has been linked with siderurgy. There were two big factories in Athus and in Halanzy and also a mine. But because of the concurrence of the foreign markets (especially the ones from Asia and Africa), siderurgy as not profitable anymore and all the factories closed one after another in the whole area.

Now the politics have tried to found new ways to develop the economy. One of the most well-known activities is the Railway Containers Terminal of Athus which deals with thousands of containers each year from the big harbors of the North Sea like Antwerp and Rotterdam to the inland of France, Germany or Luxembourg.

Transports 

There are three railway stations in the municipality: in Athus, in and in Halanzy.

The municipality is located nearby the highway E411 which links Brussels to Luxembourg City. It is situated at 30 kilometers from the capital of the Grand-Duchy and from its international airport.

See also 
 List of protected heritage sites in Aubange

References

External links
 

 
Cities in Wallonia
Articles which contain graphical timelines
Belgium–France border crossings
Belgium–Luxembourg border crossings
Municipalities of Luxembourg (Belgium)